Falsomesosella densepunctata is a species of beetle in the family Cerambycidae. It was described by Stephan von Breuning in 1968, originally under the genus Gyarancita. It is known from Laos.

References

densepunctata
Beetles described in 1968